The Icebird is a cargo vessel which delivers supplies to the Australian Antarctic Division (AAD) bases, principally Macquarie Island, Mawson, Casey and Davis Stations. The Icebird's maiden voyage to Antarctica began when she departed from Cape Town, South Africa in November 1984. 
In 1996, the vessel was renamed Polar Bird.

Specifications

Billed by her builders as the world's first purpose-built polar resupply vessel, the Icebird was custom made for Australian National Antarctic Research Expeditions (ANARE) by Antarktis und Spezialfahrt Schiffartsgesellschaft GmbH (GSS) in Germany.

Due to the large-scale rebuilding program underway at Australia's stations, the Australian Antarctic Division needed to increase the cargo space available to transport building materials. Icebird's ability to carry containers enabled the rebuilding program to switch over to the AANBUS modular construction that is so characteristic of ANARE's continental stations today.

Icebird's bow was constructed to the latest ice-breaking design, which its owners claimed would allow it to break one-year old ice with continuous speed, and so avoid the constant threat to Antarctic shipping: besetment (being surrounded by ice without helm control).

The vessel was also equipped with a temperature-controlled double skin for both the cargo holds and engine room, maintained by circulating heated fuel around the ship. It carried a helicopter and specially strengthened flight deck. The 'tween-deck hatch covers doubled as pontoons, accompanied by an ice-strengthened pusher barge, features which would permit offloading cargo in remote areas.

"It was a standard box construction, superstructure aft with side cranes. But it gave you tremendous capability - you just opened the top of the ship ... and dropped everything in and closed it up and off you went," said John Whitelaw, the Acting Assistant Director of Operations, describing the ship's unique cargo facilities.

"Icebird was fitted with a detachable accommodation module that could carry 100 passengers. It was clamped to the ship in front of the bridge and was secured with bolts," according to an interview with John Whitelaw and Annie Rushton, ANARE Jubilee Project, 21 August 1995.

Fitout

Icebird fitments include:
 dishwashers
 videos
 bar
 two-bed hospital and surgery
 air-conditioning
 laundry service

Master
The master for many years in the 1980s was Captain Ewald Brune (1951-) from Germany. He achieved 88 voyages and 25 years of Polar Maritime activity in all regions of Antarctica.

Icebreaking
Icebreaking class: Germanischer Lloyd 2002 Pt. 1, Sec. 15-A,B

Nella Dan rescue

The Icebird participated in the rescue of over 100  expeditioners and crew from the Nella Dan, which was wrecked on Macquarie Island on the evening of 3 December 1987, during resupply operations at Macquarie Island. At the time the Icebird was returning to Hobart from Davis Station in Antarctica. She arrived at Buckles Bay on 8 December 1987.

Decommissioning and revival
The Icebird remained on charter to ANARE until 1994, when it was decided that Australia's Antarctic program should revert to a one ship option as a cost-cutting measure, one which aroused considerable concern within the ANARE community.

Only two years later, during the 1998-99 season, the Aurora Australis was temporarily out of service, and a replacement ship was hired - the Icebird. Reborn under the new name of Polar Bird, and now with Norwegian owners, the Polar Bird has been chartered several years since by ANARE.

References
The Heinemann Atlas, published in Australia in 1993 by Rigby Heinemann, .
The Australian Antarctic Division Website

External links

Cargo ships
1984 ships